Harriette Thompson (27 March 1923 – 16 October 2017) was an American classical pianist who later held the record for the oldest woman to run a marathon, at age 92, and also the oldest woman to complete a half-marathon, at 94.

References

1923 births
2017 deaths
American classical pianists
American women classical pianists
American female marathon runners
People from Carlisle, Pennsylvania
Syracuse University alumni
21st-century American women